A tondo (plural "tondi" or "tondos") is a Renaissance term for a circular work of art, either a painting or a sculpture. The word derives from the Italian rotondo, "round."  The term is usually not used in English for small round paintings, but only those over about 60 cm (two feet) in diameter, thus excluding many round portrait miniatures – for sculpture the threshold is rather lower.

 A circular or oval relief sculpture is also called a roundel.

History
Artists have created tondi since Greek antiquity. The circular paintings in the centre of painted vases of that period are known as tondi, and the inside of the broad low winecup called a kylix also lent itself to circular enframed compositions. The style was revived in the fifteenth and sixteenth centuries, particularly in Italy, where it may have developed from the smaller desco da parto or birthing tray. Since then it has been less common. In Ford Madox Brown's painting The Last of England, the ship's wire railing curving round the figures helps enclose the composition within its tondo shape.

The background scene is consolidated or omitted, and to a large extent, unimportant. While the background may be visible in tondo paintings, in tondo relief carvings the background is not seen. Andrea della Robbia and other members of his family created glazed terracotta tondi that were often framed in a wreath of fruit and leaves and which were intended for immuring in a stuccoed wall. In Brunelleschi's Hospital of the Innocents, Florence, 1421–24,  Andrea della Robbia provided glazed terracotta babes in swaddling clothes in tondos with plain blue backgrounds to be set in the spandrels of the arches.

In the sixteenth century the painterly style of istoriato decoration for maiolica wares was applied to large circular dishes (see also charger).

The tondo has also been used as a design element in architecture since the Renaissance; it may serve centred in the gable-end of a pediment or under the round-headed arch that was revived in the fifteenth century.

Although the earliest true Renaissance, or late Gothic painted tondo is Burgundian, from Champmol (of a Pietá by Jean Malouel of 1400–1415, now in the Louvre), the tondo became fashionable in 15th-century Florence, with Botticelli painting many examples, both Madonnas and narrative scenes.  Michelangelo employed the circular tondo for several compositions, both painted and sculpted, including The Holy Family with the infant St. John the Baptist, the Doni Tondo at the Uffizi, as did Raphael.

The infrequently-encountered synonym rondo much more usually refers to a musical form.

Examples

Adoration of the Magi
Doni Tondo
Pitti Tondo
Severan Tondo, Roman painting of c. 200 AD
Taddei Tondo
Madonna of the Pomegranate

See also 
 Medallion (architecture): round or oval
 Cartouche (design): oval
 Panel painting: normally rectangular or capsule-shaped

References

Further reading
 Roberta J. M. Olson, The Florentine Tondo, Oxford 2000.
 Moritz Hauptmann, Der Tondo: Ursprung, Bedeutung und Geschichte des italienischen Rundbildes in Relief und Malerei, Frankfurt am Main 1936.

External links

Six tondi from the National Gallery, London

Painting
Types of sculpture
Art history
Italian Renaissance